Alexandre Giroud (born 16 March 1981) is a French rally raid motorcycle racer in the quad category. He won the Dakar Rally in 2022 and 2023. He also won the 2015 FIM Bajas World Cup and 2022 World Rally-Raid Championship in the quad category.

Career results

Rally Dakar results

References

1981 births
Living people
Sportspeople from Grenoble
French motorcycle racers
Dakar Rally motorcyclists
Dakar Rally winning drivers
Off-road motorcycle racers